The Estonian Wikipedia is the Estonian version of Wikipedia, the free encyclopedia, started on 24 August 2002.

On 7 December 2008 Estonian Wikipedian Andres Luure was one of fifteen individuals recognized for volunteerism in Estonia for 2008. In 2013 he received Order of the White Star for his contributions to Wikipedia.

The first article competition was held in spring 2009 and first photo competition in summer 2010. Since then those kinds of competitions have been common in Estonian Wikipedia.

As of February 2021, it was the most visited language Wikipedia in Estonia. It ranked before the Russian Wikipedia and the English Wikipedia.

Statistics

As of August 2012, The Estonian Wikipedia has the 3rd greatest number of articles per speaker among Wikipedias with over 100,000 articles, and ranks 10th overall. These figures were based on Ethnologue's estimate of 1,048,660 Estonian speakers.

The Estonian Wikipedia is the 41st edition to reach the milestone of 100,000 articles and the third edition in a Uralic language to do so, after the Finnish and Hungarian Wikipedias.

As of August 2012, the Estonian Wikipedia's number of articles accounts for approximately 23% of all the articles written in a Finno-Permic language, making it the second largest edition in the family after Finnish, which accounts for 70% of Finno-Permic articles.

The Estonian Wikipedia has a relatively high percentage of administrators per regular active users (over 9%) compared to the Finnish Wikipedia, where only 2.5% of active users are administrators.

The overwhelming majority of its edits originate from Estonia, while a minority of contributions come from neighboring Northern European countries, which account for most of the remaining share of editors.

Local community 
The first meeting for local Wikipedians was held in 2007.

The Estonian Wikimedia chapter named Wikimedia Eesti was founded in 2010 to support Estonian Wikipedia.

See also
Võro Wikipedia

References

External links

 
  Estonian Wikipedia

Wikipedias by language
Internet properties established in 2003
Estonian encyclopedias
Estonian-language mass media